Ninković is a surname found in Serbia, Bosnia and Croatia, a patronymic derived from given name Ninko. It may refer to:

 Djurdje S. Ninković (1888–1940) businessman and hotelier in Belgrade, Kingdom of Yugoslavia
 Đurđe Ninković (born 1942), lawyer, legal commentator and founding member of the Democratic Party (DS) in Serbia
 Jovan Ninković (born 1987), Serbian professional football player who currently plays for Górnik Łęczna
 Milica Ninković (1854–1881), Serbian feminist, journalist, and translator
 Miloš Ninković (born 1984), Serbian footballer playing for Western Sydney Wanderers FC, with shirt number 10
 Nataša Ninković (born 1972), Serbian actress, best known for her roles in the films Savior, War Live, The Professional and The Trap
 Nikola Ninković (born 1994), Serbian football midfielder who plays for Serbian SuperLiga club FK Partizan
 Ratko Ninković (born 1967), football manager and former player from Bosnia-Herzegovina
 Slobodan Ninković (born 1956), Serbian actor
 Sreten Ninković (born 1972), Serbian long-distance runner

See also
 Rob Ninkovich (born 1984), an American football player
 Nonković

Serbian surnames
Croatian surnames